Puka Urqu (Quechua puka red, urqu mountain, "red mountain",  Hispanicized spelling Pucaorjo) is a mountain in the La Raya mountain range in the Andes of Peru, about  high. It is situated in the Puno Region, Melgar Province, Santa Rosa District. Puka Urqu lies near the La Raya pass north of Khunurana.

References

Mountains of Puno Region
Mountains of Peru